Saint Joseph Seeks a Lodging at Bethlehem is an opaque watercolor painting over graphite by James Tissot. The painting was created between 1886-1894, near the end of James Tissot's Career. This style of painting is also known as Gouache.

The painting depicts Mary and her husband, Joseph, looking for a room for the night. Because of the Census of Caesar Augustus (also known as the Census of Quirinius), the town is overcrowded and there is no room to be had. So they are being turned away at every door. In the picture itself, Joseph pleads with an inn keeper to give them a place to rest, while the weary Mary waits on the donkey with quiet resignation. The painting  "strikes a realistic note" depicting Mary as a veiled woman in a narrow alley of an Eastern town.

The painting is currently being displayed at the Brooklyn Museum and is available for download and print.

See also
 James Tissot's later career
 Gospel of Luke
 Census of Quirinius
 Gouache style of painting

References

External links 
 archive.org
 biblegateway.org
 brooklynmuseum.org

19th-century paintings
Paintings of the Virgin Mary
Paintings of Saint Joseph
Paintings by James Tissot
Paintings in the collection of the Brooklyn Museum
Watercolor paintings
Donkeys in art